"Grace" is the first single by former Live lead singer Ed Kowalczyk from his debut solo album Alive, as well as on an autographed Limited Edition CD.

Track listing
 "Grace" (New Version)
 "Grace" (Live from Sydney)
 "Grace" (Album Version)

Charts

References

2010 debut singles
Ed Kowalczyk songs
Songs written by Ed Kowalczyk
Songs written by Gregg Wattenberg
2010 songs
V2 Records singles

2010 singles